Pelliales is an order of liverworts.

Classification
Taxonomy based on work by Söderström et al. 2016 and synonyms from Collection of genus-group names in a systematic arrangement.

 Noterocladaceae Frey & Stech 2005
 Noteroclada Taylor ex Hooker & Wilson 1844
 Pelliaceae von Klinggräff 1858
 Pellia Raddi 1818 nom. cons.

References

 
Liverwort orders